The United States military has numerous types of watercraft, operated by the Navy, including Naval Special Warfare Command and Military Sealift Command, as well as the Coast Guard, Army and Air Force

Commissioned ships (USN)

Aircraft carriers

  – 10 active
  – 1 active

Amphibious assault ships

  – 7 active
  – 2 active

Amphibious command ships
  – 2 active

Amphibious transport docks
  – 12 active

Attack submarines

  – 26 active
  – 3 active
  – 21 active

Ballistic missile submarines
  – 14 active

Classic frigate
  – oldest commissioned ship in USN, an 'Original Six' frigate,  circa. 1797. Not counted as part of the deployed combat fleet.

Cruisers

  – 17 active

Destroyers
  – 70 active
  – 2 active

Dock landing ships
  – 6 active
  – 4 active

Expeditionary mobile base
(sub-variant of the expeditionary transfer dock)

USS

Guided missile submarines
  – 4 active

Littoral combat ships
  – 10 active
  – 12 active

Mine countermeasures ships
  – 8 active

Patrol boats
  – 5 active

Submarine tenders
  – 2 active

Technical research ship
  – currently held captive by North Korea. Still in commission, but not counted as part of the deployed combat fleet.

Non-commissioned ships (MSC)

(List includes "Support" and "Ready Reserve Force" ships)

Cable repair ships
  – 1 active

Cargo and replenishment ships

  – 8 active
  – 7 active
  – 3 active
  – 2 active
  – 2 active
  – 14 active
  – 15 active

Crane ships
  – 3 active
  – 3 active

Expeditionary transfer dock

Expeditionary Transfer Dock (ESD) – 2 active
Expeditionary Mobile Base (ESB) – 3 active (2 commissioned)

High speed vessels
  – 9 active
Stand-alone vessels;
 Sea Fighter (FSF-1) – active
  – active
 HST-2 (unnamed) – leased to civilian ferry service

Hospital ships

  – 2 active

Landing craft

 Landing Craft Air Cushion – 74 active
 Landing Craft Utility 1610, 1627 and 1646 – 32 active

Salvage ships
  – 2 active

Surveillance, intelligence and survey vessels
  – 1 active
  – 1 active
  – 6 active
  – 2 active
  – 4 active

Tug boats
  – 4 active
  – 8 active
  – 6 active

Special Warfare and Coastal Riverine Force (NSW)

Surface craft

 Combat Rubber Raiding Craft
 Small unit riverine craft
 Riverine Command Boat
 Rigid Raider
 Mark V Special Operations Craft
 Special Operations Craft - Riverine (SOC-R)
 Mark VI Patrol Boat
 Coastal Command Boat (CCB)
 Combatant Craft Assault (CCA)
 Combatant Craft Medium (CCM)
 Combatant Craft Heavy (CCH)

Swimmer delivery vehicles
 Swimmer Delivery Vehicle (Mk 8)
 Surface-Planing Wet Submersible

Cutters (USCG)

Patrol ships
 Legend-class National Security Cutter, Large 8
 
 Famous-class Medium Endurance Cutter 13
 Reliance-class Medium Endurance Cutter 14
  38

Patrol boats
  30
  73
 47-foot Motor Lifeboat 117
 Response boat-medium 48
 USCG Utility Boat 156
 USCG Long Range Interceptor 10
 Defender class Response boat-small 300
 USCG transportable port security boat
 Over the horizon boat
 Short Range Prosecutor 10

Icebreakers 
  9 active
  1 active
Stand-alone vessels;

Tenders 
 USCG seagoing buoy tender
 USCG coastal buoy tender
 USCG inland buoy tender
 USCG inland construction tender

Support craft (US Army)

Logistics support vessel
 General Frank S. Besson-class logistics support vessel – 8

Landing craft
 Runnymede class large landing craft – 35
 Landing Craft Mechanized
LCM-8, Mod 1 - 34
LCM-8, Mod 2 - 6

Tug boats
  – 6

Support craft (USAF)

Tug boats
 Rising Star tugboat (Thule AFB harbor)

Recovery craft
 82nd ATRS drone recovery watercraft (x3 120 ft recovery vessels, x2 smaller boats)

See also 
 Currently active military equipment by country

References

United States, Watercraft
Watercraft, active
Watercraft, active